Richard John Beattie Seaman (4 February 1913 – 25 June 1939) was a British Grand Prix racing driver. He drove for the Mercedes-Benz team from 1937 to 1939 in the Mercedes-Benz W125 and W154 cars, winning the 1938 German Grand Prix. He died of his injuries after his car overturned at the 1939 Belgian Grand Prix.

Early life
Seaman was born in Aldingbourne House near Chichester, Sussex, into a wealthy family, the son of William John Beattie-Seaman and Lillian Seaman.  He initially lived at Kentwell Hall, Long Melford, Suffolk, developing an enthusiasm for motoring from his childhood. After studying at Rugby School Seaman moved onto Trinity College, Cambridge, where as a student Seaman's first experience of racing was at the 1931 Shelsley Walsh Speed Hill Climb near the Malvern Hills, won by Whitney Straight. Seaman's parents encouraged him to become a Member of Parliament or a lawyer. During his time at Cambridge University Seaman and a friend embarked on a three-day flight to South Africa, and he often cruised around Europe with his family. His family bought Pull Court in Worcestershire in 1933, former home of the two politicians Richard Dowdeswell, father and son, as a stately home for him to inherit. In 1934 he resolved to become a racing driver and took his MG car to the European mainland to gain experience.

Career

Early career
In his early career Seaman won the Voiturette race of the Swiss Grand Prix event at Bremgarten at his first attempt, he went on to win it three times consecutively. He won other small races for English Racing Automobiles (ERA), notably at Brooklands and Donington Park. Seaman competed in the Mont Ventoux Hill Climb after being encouraged to do so by Straight. 
A talented Anglo-American aristocratic racing driver, Straight, a resident of Dartington Hall, served as Seaman's friend and mentor during his early years of motor racing.

In 1935 Seaman enjoyed a fruitful year with ERA, he took pole position at the 1935 Dieppe Grand Prix, and won the junior category of the 1935 Coppa Acerbo. In his early years Seaman took part in speed trials on the Eynsham bypass near his student home of Cambridge, but by the 1936 Grand Prix Season he was more focused on Grand Prix racing.

Seaman was very successful in the 1936 season both in UK and on the Continent using a 1926  Delage race car which was developed and modified to be almost unbeatable at the time with Seaman driving. He won the British Empire Trophy in 1936 at Donington Park in an ERA. Seaman also won the 1936 Donington Grand Prix in a Delage sharing the honour with Swiss Grand Prix driver Hans Rüesch.

Seaman competeded in numerous hill climb events also, winning his class at Freiburg in 1936, impressively only a second behind the overall winner Hans Stuck in an Auto Union.

Eventually Mercedes team chief Alfred Neubauer invited him for a trial at the Nürburgring. Both Silver Arrows teams used to have at least one foreign driver, if available.

Seaman had his last outing in a Delage at the 1937 South African Grand Prix in East London from which he retired.

In 1937 he signed for Mercedes-Benz against the wishes of his mother, who did not want him to drive for a "Nazi" team. The Mercedes (and their rival Auto Union) cars, which were part of a racing program that was German government subsidized were far faster, better financed, better built, more advanced and more reliable than any of the racing cars he had driven previously. He now had a chance to win Grands Prix and be one of the top drivers in the European Grand Prix championship.

1937 Grand Prix season
Seaman had a poor start to his Mercedes career in the 1937 Grand Prix Season, he was involved in the fatal accident of Ernst von Delius at the 1937 German Grand Prix, his injuries prevented him from competing at the following races, the Monaco Grand Prix and the Coppa Acerbo in Italy. Nonetheless, he finished fourth at the Italian Grand Prix at Livorno and repeated the feat at the non-championship Czechoslovakian Grand Prix at Brno. Neubauer demoted Seaman to reserve driver at the Swiss Grand Prix, much to his disappointment. Outside of Europe Seaman finished second to Bernd Rosemeyer at the Vanderbilt Cup in Long Island, New York in the United States. He also met former King Edward VIII on his visit to Nazi Germany.

1938 Grand Prix season
Seaman further excelled in the 1938 season – he won the German Grand Prix- the biggest race of the year for the German teams, and became one of the favourite drivers of Adolf Hitler, it was the first time a British driver had won an AIACR European Championship race since Henry Segrave won the 1923 French Grand Prix. After his win, Mercedes retained Seaman as a reserve driver, racing in Livorno and Pescara whilst Seaman took a break. On his return, Seaman took pole and finished second in the Swiss Grand Prix at Bremgarten, his favourite circuit, and finished third at his home Grand Prix at Donington Park following a spin. His friend and biographer, George Monkhouse, called Seaman's drive at the Swiss Grand Prix, in difficult wet conditions, the best of his career.

1939 Grand Prix season and death

Seaman met Hitler at the 1939 Berlin Motor Show.

Seaman had a slow start to the 1939 Grand Prix season, he attended the 1939 French Grand Prix but did not compete. Neubauer did not allow him to compete at the Tripoli Grand Prix. He competed at the 1939 Eifelrennen at the Nürburgring but retired early on with a broken clutch.

Leading the 1939 Belgian Grand Prix at Spa-Francorchamps during a wet race, Seaman crashed his car into a tree during lap 22. It is thought he was using a line through a corner that was only normally used in the dry. After the impact, the car caught fire, with the unconscious driver still inside. Seaman died a few hours later as a result of his burns, at just 26 years of age; it was Mercedes' only fatality during that time. On his death bed he remarked to the Mercedes chief engineer, "I was going too fast for the conditions – it was entirely my own fault. I am sorry."

After Seaman's death, Mercedes-Benz dealerships worldwide were ordered to display his photograph in their windows. Richard Seaman was buried at Putney Vale Cemetery in London. Mercedes-Benz still tend to his grave down to this day.

Personal life

Seaman had a difficult relationship with his mother Lillian, who did not support his decision to drive for a "foreign" team, associated with Nazism. Seaman fell out of love with his home Pull Court following his inability to find local staff to service a planned party involving Seaman's Grand Prix compatriots; Prince Bira was to be invited.

Seaman divided most of his time between Worcestershire and London, also spending a large amount of money on travel, he often enjoyed Waterskiing.

As a wealthy aristocrat Seaman got on well with his fellow Mercedes Grand Prix teammates Manfred Von Brauchitsch and Rudolf Caracciola who were from wealthy German families.

In December 1938 he married Erica Popp, the daughter of the director of BMW, again against his mother's wishes. Seaman was 25 and Popp was 18. His new father in law bought the couple a home in Bavaria as a wedding present.

Following Seaman's death, Popp spent the Second World War in the UK and the U.S. In 1940 she was engaged to fellow Grand Prix driver Reggie Tongue but the couple never married. She married twice again, and died in Sarasota, Florida in February 1990 at the age of 69. She wore her engagement ring bought by Seaman for the rest of her life.

Lillian Seaman mourned her son for the rest of her life, she made attempts to sell Pull Court, but died of heart failure in London in 1948.

Legacy 
Seaman's career has been cited as an inspiration for future Mercedes Grand Prix drivers Stirling Moss and Lewis Hamilton, he is often viewed along with Henry Segrave as one of Britain's greatest pre-war Grand Prix Drivers. Pull Court is now Bredon School, catering for children of all abilities and especially those with learning disabilities. Mythology surrounds Seaman's association with the house. Some believe that Seaman's Mercedes Grand Prix cars are buried in the estate, others believe that his mother, Lillian Seaman, left the lights at Pull Court on during the Second World War to guide German bombers, although both these rumours are doubtful.

In his autobiography Mercedes teammate Hermann Lang descried Seaman as "kind-hearted, cool and fair as a sportsman, just as I has always pictured Englishmen to be".

Seaman's legacy has been tarnished with accusations of Nazism, indeed he was privately complimentary of Hitler and controversially gave a Nazi salute following his victory at the 1938 German Grand Prix. Moreover, the largest wreath at his funeral was sent by Hitler, against the wishes of his family.

However biographer Richard Williams has stated that Seaman simply wanted to drive for whichever team had the fastest car, irrespective of politics.

Seaman's career had perhaps been overshadowed by more successful Grand Prix drivers of the era, such as Tazio Nuvolari and Rudolf Caracciola, and his contribution to British motor-racing history is largely forgotten. Nonetheless, Seaman won a total of 13 events in his career, at a time when far fewer Motorsport events were held, and in his day was one of the most famous British sportsmen of the 1930s.

It would not be until the 1955 British Grand Prix that another British driver would win an international championship event, and at the 1957 British Grand Prix, Vanwall drivers Stirling Moss and Tony Brooks achieved Seaman's lifelong ambition to win a Grand Prix in a British car.

A memorial stone was set up to Seaman at Spa-Francorchamps but today it is missing.

Results 
1934: Coppa Acerbo (Voiturette) (3), Swiss Grand Prix (Voiturette) (1), Czech Grand Prix (Voiturette) (5)
1935: DNF Frontieres GP, Eifelrennen (Voiturette) (4), Coppa Acerbo (Voiturette) (1), Swiss Grand Prix (Voiturette) (1), Czech Grand Prix (Voiturette) (1)
1936: British Empire Trophy (Handicap) (1), Isle of Man (Voiturette) (1), German Grand Prix (8), Coppa Ciano (Voiturette) (6), Coppa Acerbo (Voiturette) (1), DNF Coppa Acerbo, Swiss Grand Prix (Voiturette) (1), JCC 200 Miles (Voiturette) (1), Donington Grand Prix (1)
1937: Tripoli Grand Prix (7), AVUS Grand Prix (5), DNF Eifelrennen GP, Vanderbilt Cup (2), DNF German Grand Prix, Coppa Acerbo (5), 1937 Italian Grand Prix (4), 1937 Czechoslovakian Grand Prix (4), DNF 1937 Donington Grand Prix Donington
1938: DNS French Grand Prix, German Grand Prix (1), Swiss Grand Prix (2), DNF Italian Grand Prix, Donington Grand Prix (3)
1939: DNS Pau Grand Prix, DNF Eifelrennen GP, DNF Belgian Grand Prix

Racing record

Complete European Championship results
(key) (Races in bold indicate pole position; races in italics indicate fastest lap)

References

Notes

Bibliography

External links 

 Biography of Dick Seaman
 "The master race" (The Guardian Sept 1, 2002)

1913 births
1939 deaths
English racing drivers
Grand Prix drivers
Racing drivers who died while racing
Sportspeople from Chichester
BRDC Gold Star winners
Sport deaths in Belgium
Burials at Putney Vale Cemetery
Alumni of Trinity College, Cambridge
People educated at Rugby School
European Championship drivers